Notton is a civil parish in the metropolitan borough of the City of Wakefield, West Yorkshire, England.  The parish contains four listed buildings that are recorded in the National Heritage List for England.  All the listed buildings are designated at Grade II, the lowest of the three grades, which is applied to "buildings of national importance and special interest".  The parish contains the village of Notton and the surrounding countryside.  The listed buildings consist of three houses and a bridge over a railway.


Buildings

References

Citations

Sources

Lists of listed buildings in West Yorkshire